Calliostoma laugieri is a species of sea snail, a marine gastropod mollusk in the family Calliostomatidae.

Subspecies
 Calliostoma laugieri laugieri (Payraudeau, 1826)
 Calliostoma laugieri spongiarum (Bucquoy, Dautzenberg & Dollfus, 1885)

Description
The size of the shell varies between 7 mm and 17 mm. The shell is similar to Calliostoma conulus, but smaller, generally darker in color. The apical whorls are not (or but slightly) granulate. The form is straightly conical with about 8 whorls. The minute apical whorl is smooth. The following whorls, to the number of three or less, are granulate. Then there are several spirally grooved whorls, the lower ones either smooth or grooved. The distinct supra-sutural fasciole is articulated. The base of the shell is spirally grooved, sometimes smooth except around the axis. The color of the shell is very mutable with numerous varieties:  dark olive-green or olive-brown, unicolored or longitudinally clouded with brown and lineolate with bluish; or yellowish, clouded with brown or yellow; or uniform purple. The aperture is sulcate or smooth inside.

Distribution
This species occurs in the Mediterranean Sea and off Portugal.

References

 Gofas, S.; Le Renard, J.; Bouchet, P. (2001). Mollusca, in: Costello, M.J. et al. (Ed.) (2001). European register of marine species: a check-list of the marine species in Europe and a bibliography of guides to their identification. Collection Patrimoines Naturels, 50: pp. 180–213

External links
 

laugieri
Gastropods described in 1826